The Haras Nationaux in France (English literal translation national stud farms) was the French national public administrative body responsible for the regulation and administration of breeding of horses and donkeys in France. It administered twenty-two regional studs, or horse-breeding centres.

History

From 1870 until 1999, Haras Nationaux was a branch of the French ministry of agriculture, then it became an independent governmental department managing the twenty two national stud farms.

In 2013 the twenty-two national stud farms were privatized, however IFCE continued to support the studs by paying about 75% of the employee salaries. But in 2019 the IFCE announced it would stop supporting the studs and the salary payments would cease as of 2022.

Regional centres

The regional centres of the Haras Nationaux are:
 Site d'Amboise et de Blois, Blois, Centre-Val de Loire
 Haras national d'Aurillac, Aurillac, Auvergne
 Haras national de Besançon, Besançon, Franche-Comté
 Haras national des Bréviaires, Les Bréviaires, Île-de-France
 Site de Chazey-sur-Ain, Chazey-sur-Ain, Rhône-Alpes
 Haras national de Cluny, Cluny, Burgundy
 Haras national de Compiègne, Compiègne, Picardy
 Haras national d'Hennebont, Hennebont, Brittany
 Haras national de La Roche, La Roche-sur-Yon, Pays de la Loire
 Haras national de Lamballe, Lamballe, Brittany
 Haras national du Pin, Le Pin-au-Haras, Normandy
 Haras national du Lion, Le Lion-d'Angers, Pays de la Loire
 Haras national de Montier, Montier-en-Der, Champagne-Ardenne
 Haras national de Gelos, Gelos, Nouvelle-Aquitaine
 Haras national de Pompadour, Arnac-Pompadour, Limousin
 Haras national de Rodez, Rodez, Midi-Pyrénées
 Haras national de Rosières, Rosières-aux-Salines, Lorraine
 Haras national de Saint-Lô, Saint-Lô, Basse-Normandie
 Haras national de Saintes, Saintes, Nouvelle-Aquitaine
 Haras national de Tarbes, Tarbes, Midi-Pyrénées
 Haras national d'Uzès, Uzès, Languedoc-Roussillon
 Haras national de Villeneuve, Villeneuve-sur-Lot, Nouvelle-Aquitaine

References

Further reading
 Jacques Mulliez (2004). Les chevaux du royaume: aux origines des Haras nationaux (in French). Paris: Belin. .

External links

Agricultural organizations based in France